Zhang Linpeng (born 9 May 1989) is a Chinese professional footballer who currently plays for Chinese Super League club Shanghai Port.

Zhang is known by the nickname Zhangmos for his similarity in looks and playing style as Sergio Ramos. An offensive minded defender, Zhang is also known for his tackling ability and aerial game. He was highly praised by Italian manager Marcello Lippi who described him as "the best Chinese footballer in the Chinese Super League".

Club career
Zhang Linpeng would play as a youngster for the Genbao Football Academy before he graduated to the Shanghai East Asia's first team at the beginning of the 2006 league season. With the club in the third tier, Zhang quickly made an impression within the team when he was part of the squad that won promotion to the second tier at the end of the 2007 league season. Within the second tier, Zhang  played a major part in ensuring the club remained in the division and by the 2009 season, the club finished fourth and just missed out on promotion. His performance for his club then saw him receive an unexpected call-up to the Chinese national team where he impressed many by scoring on his debut against Jordan. This then saw Zhang become the most sought after player in China before he transferred to Chinese Super League side Guangzhou Evergrande for a fee of ¥12 million in November 2010.

He made his debut for the club on 2 April 2011 in a 1–0 win against Dalian Shide. Throughout the season, Zhang was used as a squad player as Guangzhou won their first ever league title at the end of the 2012 season. He soon established himself as a mainstay in the team's backline during the 2013 season, leading the club to a third straight league title as well as an AFC Champions League title, the first in the club's history.

During preseason before the 2015 season, Zhang sustained a medial accessory ligament tear on his left knee joint on 7 February 2015 in a friendly match against Hangzhou Greentown. While recovering from his surgery in Italy, Zhang was linked with Serie A side Inter Milan with manager Roberto Mancini also confirming his interest in Zhang. However, Guangzhou insisted that Zhang was worth €10 million which far exceeded what Inter was willing to pay. After recovering from injury, Zhang came on as a substitute and scored a goal on 3 April 2015 in a 2–1 loss against Henan Jianye. He then went on to score a 60-meter goal on 12 April 2015 in a 6–1 win against Liaoning Whowin. On 28 May 2015, he suffered a reoccurrence of a left knee strain on 27 May 2015 in a 2–0 win against Seongnam FC. On 20 July 2015, Zhang extended his contract with Guangzhou until 31 December 2020. Zhang returned from injury on 12 August 2015 in a 1–0 win against Jiangsu Sainty. On 28 August 2015, Premier League side Chelsea made an offer to Guangzhou for Zhang, hoping to complete the transfer before the summer transfer window closed; however, the deal couldn't be completed due to limited time while the two clubs failed to agree on certain terms during negotiations.

On 29 April 2022, Zhang returned to Shanghai Port.

International career
Zhang quickly  worked his way up through the various Chinese youth teams, first by playing for the Chinese under-20 national team in the 2008 AFC U-19 Championship where he captained the team to the quarter-finals. This saw him promoted to the Chinese under-23 national team to play in the 2009 East Asian Games where China disappointingly were knocked out in the group stage.

Despite the under-23 national team's failures, Zhang's performances were considered good enough for then manager Gao Hongbo to unexpectedly call him up to the national team even though he was playing for a second-tier side. He made an impressive international debut on 30 December 2009 in a 2–2 draw against Jordan, scoring on his debut as well. After his debut, Zhang was called up to the squad that won the 2010 East Asian Football Championship before establishing himself as a regular for the team that took part in the 2011 AFC Asian Cup.

Personal life
Zhang is of Hui ethnicity and is a Muslim. He married his girlfriend Wang Qiaozhi on 21 May 2011 and their son was born on 1 September 2014.

Career statistics

Club statistics

International statistics

International goals
 
Scores and results list China's goal tally first.

Honours

Club
Shanghai East Asia
China League Two: 2007

Guangzhou Evergrande
Chinese Super League: 2011, 2012, 2013, 2014, 2015, 2016, 2017, 2019
AFC Champions League: 2013, 2015
Chinese FA Cup: 2012, 2016
Chinese FA Super Cup: 2012, 2016, 2017, 2018

International
China PR national football team
East Asian Football Championship: 2010

Individual
Chinese Super League Team of the Year: 2013, 2014, 2015, 2016, 2018
AFC Champions League Dream Team: 2013, 2015

Notes

References

External links
 
 
 Biography at hudong.com

1989 births
Living people
Sportspeople from Jinan
Hui sportspeople
Chinese Muslims
Chinese footballers
Footballers from Shandong
China international footballers
Shanghai Port F.C. players
Guangzhou F.C. players
Chinese Super League players
China League One players
China League Two players
2011 AFC Asian Cup players
2015 AFC Asian Cup players
2019 AFC Asian Cup players
Footballers at the 2010 Asian Games
Association football defenders
Asian Games competitors for China